Lake Ozonia is a lake located by Lake Ozonia, New York, St. Lawrence county in the Adirondacks in upstate New York. The outlet of the lake is Lake Ozonia Outlet which flows into the St. Regis River.

Fishing 
The lake is a popular fishing spot partly because it is close to the St. Regis River which is stocked with over 10,000 trout each year. The lake itself harbors different species of fish including splake, atlantic salmon, rainbow trout, brown trout, american eel, lake trout, landlocked salmon, smallmouth bass, yellow perch, and brown bullhead. It can be fished year-round and there is a NYSDEC carry-down boat launch located on Lake Ozonia Road. The lake may only be accessed by a non-motorized boat or a motorized boat with a 10 horsepower or less motor.

Links 

https://www.facebook.com/LakeOzoniaWaterfront

References 

Ozonia
Ozonia